The men's 400 metres hurdles competition at the 1998 Asian Games in Bangkok, Thailand was held on 15–17 December at the Thammasat Stadium.

Schedule
All times are Indochina Time (UTC+07:00)

Results
Legend
DNF — Did not finish

Heats
 Qualification: First 3 in each heat (Q) and the next 2 fastest (q) advance to the final.

Heat 1

Heat 2

Final 

 Abdullah Sabt Ghulam of the United Arab Emirates originally finished 7th, but was later disqualified after he tested positive for Ephedrine.

References

External links
Results

Men's 00400 metres
1998